The 2011–12 Stony Brook Seawolves men's basketball team represented Stony Brook University in the 2011–12 NCAA Division I men's basketball season. They were coached by seventh year head coach Steve Pikiell and played their home games at Pritchard Gymnasium. They are members of the America East Conference. The Seawolves were America East regular season champions but failed to win the America East Basketball Championship game for the second straight year. As regular season champions, they received an automatic bid into the 2012 NIT and faced Seton Hall in the first round.

Previous season

The Seawolves were pre-season ranked second in the league, however, injures to most of their starters throughout the season largely affected the team. Tommy Brenton was out for the whole season due to injury and used a medical redshirt, Chris Martin also was injured most of the season, and other starters also suffered from injuries. The Seawolves struggled in the offensive end (ranked 337th in FG% in Division I), but were one of the top defensive teams in the NCAA allowing them to finish 5th in the America East with an 8–8 record. Despite the challenges in the offensive end, the Seawolves gained enough momentum to close the season with wins against Hartford and Binghamton. The Seawolves were ranked fifth in the 2011 America East tournament and went in an unlikely run to beat fourth seeded Albany, 67–61, and top seeded Vermont, 69–47, in back to back days at West Hartford, two teams who swept the Seawolves in the regular season series. For the first time in Seawolves Division I history they were to play in the America East Championship at second ranked Boston University. For most of the game, the Seawolves held to a substantial lead, and held a fifteen-point lead early in the fourth quarter. However, Boston rallied back with a late run to tie Stony Brook and take the lead with two seconds of regulation ending in a 56–54 loss for the Seawolves to end their season.

Before the season

Losses
The Seawolves lost to graduation their sole senior Chris Martin. Early in the offseason, it was reported that Preye Preboye was officially released from the team and currently playing at the Division II level for Lynn University

Recruitment

Preseason tour (Europe)

The Seawolves basketball program headed to Europe for their first ever international preseason trip. A five-game exhibition series was played in Dublin, Ireland, London, England, and in Paris, France from August 11 to the 21st in which the Seawolves faced professional teams from the leagues of each respective country. The Seawolves came out victorious in four of the five occasions. All five games were broadcast in WUSB.FM, the first time the Seawolves were broadcast from international grounds.

Ranking and polls

In October, the Seawolves were picked by multiple media outlets to finish #1 in the America East for the upcoming 2011–12 season. Sporting News College Basketball Preview magazine picked the Seawolves as #1 and also named Bryan Dougher a preseason All-America East. Lindy's College Basketball Preview echoed SNCBP announcements and CBSsports.com also picked the Seawolves to finish as regular season champions. The Seawolvesw were picked second in the Coaches Pre-season poll released in October 13, America East Tip-off, receiving 56 points and three first place votes against Boston U(defending tournament champions) 62 points and six first place votes.

Honors
Bryan Dougher was announced to be in Preseason All-America East first team released in the America East Tip-Off Luncheon in October 13. Bryan Dougher and Tommy Brenton were selected to the First team All-Conference, in addition, Brenton was also selected to the All-Defensive team. Brenton was also announced to be the Defensive Player of the Year and head coach Steve Pikiell was awarded Coach of the Year, second time overall.

Roster

Coaching
Coaching for the Stony Brook Seawolves remains the same, and no changes to those of the previous season. Pikiell will remain as the head coach with a contract extension through the 2015–16 season.

Schedule

In October 2011, Stony Brook announced a new partnership with New York cable provider Cablevision to broadcast 8 Men's basketball games and 3 Women's basketball games through the Optimum Network in the Long Island area. These games will be produced by Stony Brook and broadcast on Cablevision's Optimum Locals 118. Additionally, the MSG Network will regionally air the Rutgers matchup and ESPNU airing the Boston University game.

|-
!colspan=9| European Tour (Exhibition)

|-
!colspan=9|Regular Season

|-
!colspan=9|2012 America East tournament

|-
!colspan=9| 2012 NIT

References

Stony Brook
Stony Brook Seawolves men's basketball seasons
Stony Brook
Stony Brook
Stony Brook